Lawrence "Larry" Janesky is an American businessman, entrepreneur, author and trainer. Janesky is the founder and CEO of Contractor Nation &  Basement Systems Inc.  He is the co-founder of Total Basement Finishing, Inc., Supportworks, Inc., Dr. Energy Saver, Inc., and Klaus Roofing Systems. Janesky began his local basement waterproofing company (Connecticut Basement Systems) in 1987, serving homeowners in the Fairfield, New Haven, and New London, CT counties. CTBS has been in business for over 35 years and now serves all of CT's Counties and Westchester, NY. 

In his early years, Janesky pursued multiple opportunities to improve the basement waterproofing industry, with specific regard to its products & processes. Moisture build-up in a homes basement can be the catalyst for a multitude of other issues, including; cracked or crumbling foundations, mold growth, poor air quality in the home, and more. This inspired Janesky to continue to grow his business model, and launch the Basement Systems Network. This private network consists of 100s of local home improvement businesses across the US & Canada. In-network contractors have access to proprietary products, trainings, and resources. The public facing name of this network is now Contractor Nation, formerly Basement Systems, with many people still referring to Janesky as, "the All Things Basementy guy".  

His passions don't end with home improvement, Janesky is an avid motocross racer, frequently competing in the longest non-stop cross country race in the world: the Baja 1000. His daily blog, www.Thinkdaily.com, has over 20k subscribers and his self-made motocross movie, Into the Dust, has been viewed more than 4.8 million times on YouTube. Now with multiple sequels available.    

He is also a proud Eagle Scout in the Boy Scouts of America.

Career
Larry Janesky was born in Bridgeport Connecticut in 1964. Active in boy scouts, he earned the Eagle Scout rank at age 14.  He graduated high school at age 17 in 1982 from Bullard-Havens Technical High School located in Bridgeport, CT. He did not go to college but immediately began his career as a self-employed carpenter remodeling and building homes. He was contracted to build a 3,000 square foot house at age 18 and was spec building by age 20. 

In 1987 he started his own company providing basement waterproofing and radon mitigation services, calling it Connecticut Basement Systems.  Janesky invented and developed a line of waterproofing products of which he was the exclusive installer. He acquired patents on his waterproofing products and currently holds 31 patents.

In 1990, Janesky began creating a network of basement waterproofing contractors naming it Basement Systems, Inc. The contractors were made the exclusive dealers and installers in their area of the patented waterproofing products.  Currently, there are over 220 dealers in the Basement System Dealer Network.

Other companies
Janesky also launched the following companies:
 CleanSpace (1999)
 Treehouse Marketing (2005)
 Total Basement Finishing, Inc. (2006)
 Supportworks, Inc. (2008)  Janesky sold his interest in 2016.  
 Dr. Energy Saver, Inc. (2009)
 The Contractor Nation School of Entrepreneurship (2016)  
Larry also made a partnership investment in The Junkluggers.  

In 2019, Janesky's Contractor Nation purchased Master Systems Inc., headquartered in Knoxville, Tennessee. 

In 2019, Janesky partnered with Klaus Roofing Systems to launch Klaus Roofing Systems Network.

Recognition & awards
In 2012, Janesky was awarded the Connecticut Small Business Person of the Year

In 2015, Janesky received the National Eagle Scout Association's Outstanding Eagle Scout Award.  

In 2015, Janesky won the Ernst & Young Entrepreneur of the Year Award.   

Janesky has also appeared on the Bob Vila Show  and the Ron Hazelton Show.

Motocross
Janesky is a motocross rider, winning in the Sportsman Class of the Baja 1000 in 2015. 

Janesky and his son Tanner Janesky are the only Father/Son duo to complete both the Baja 500 and the Baja 1000.

In 2017, Janesky starred in a self-made Documentary “Into The Dust” about the 2015 Race. Janesky and his son Tanner would go on to compete in multiple Baja 1000 annually.   Janesky released “Into The Dust 2” in 2020.   

In 2018, Janesky became the oldest participant to finish the Baja 1000.  

In 2018, Janesky took 2nd place in Pro Moto Ironman Class during the Baja 1000.

Bibliography
Janesky is the author or co-author of multiple books which include:
 2005: Dry Basement Science 
 2008: Basement Finishing Science 
 2009: Home Comfort Science 
 2009: Saving Energy at Home 
 Co-authors: Tim Snyder, Tom Casey
 2010: The Highest Calling 
 2010 Grand Champion, Small Business Trends Business Book Awards
 2010 Best Business Book, New England Book Festival
 2011 Best Business Book, Indie Book Awards
 2010: Foundation Repair Science 
 Co-authors: David Thrasher, Amanda Harrington
 2012: Crawl Space Science 
 2013 Mold Prevention Science 
 Co-author: Clint S. Cooper
2019: Iron Sharpens Iron: Challenge of a Lifetime

References

External links
 Highest Calling Book Website
 Watch Into the Dust
 Think Daily

American chief executives
Living people
People from Stratford, Connecticut
1964 births
American inventors